The Subprefecture of Perus is one of 32 subprefectures of the city of São Paulo, Brazil.  It comprises two districts: Anhanguera and Perus.

References

Subprefectures of São Paulo